The France men's national tennis team represents France in Davis Cup tennis competition, and is governed by the Fédération Française de Tennis.  France competed in their first Davis Cup in 1904. 
France is the third most successful nation, with ten wins.  Their most recent title came in 2017 (World Champion team).

In 2018 France will compete in the World Group for the 36th time out of 38 years, which ranks them fifth in this category.

Media coverage
France's Davis Cup matches are currently televised by France Télévisions.

Current team (2018) 

 Adrian Mannarino (First Round, Singles)
 Richard Gasquet (First Round Singles)
 Nicolas Mahut (First Round, Quarterfinals, Semifinals Doubles)
 Pierre-Hugues Herbert (First Round, Quarterfinals Doubles)
 Lucas Pouille (Quarterfinals, Semifinals Singles)
 Jeremy Chardy (Quarterfinals, Singles)
 Benoît Paire (Semifinals, Singles)
 Julien Benneteau (Semifinals, Doubles)

Captains

Results

2000–2009

2010–2019

Individual and team records

References

External links

Davis Cup teams
Davis Cup
Davis Cup